Nong Fak halt, original name Thung Khwang halt was a railway station on the Suphanburi Line located in Tambon Thung Bua, Amphoe Kamphaeng Saen, Nakhon Pathom Province, Thailand. There was only one platform, on the east side of the track. The station is now closed and no trains stop at it.

Nong Fak was originally named Thung Khwang.

References

External links
 Rotfaithai Dot Com 

Defunct railway stations in Thailand